Charles E. Taylor may refer to:
 Charlie Taylor (mechanic) (Charles Edward Taylor, 1868–1956), American inventor, mechanic and machinist
 Charles E. Taylor (engineer) (1924–2017), American engineer and professor
 Charlie Taylor (footballer, born 1884) (Charles Everate Taylor, 1884–1953), Australian rules footballer
 Charles E. Taylor (politician), member of the Montana State Senate

See also
 Charles Taylor (disambiguation)